Wolfgang Büchner may refer to:

 Wolfgang Büchner (journalist) (born 1966), German journalist
 Wolfgang Büchner (canoeist), East German slalom canoeist